Garbiñe Muguruza defeated Barbora Krejčíková in the final, 7–6(8–6), 6–3 to win the women's singles tennis event at the 2021 Dubai Tennis Championships. Muguruza dropped just one set the entire tournament, to Aryna Sabalenka in the quarterfinals.

Simona Halep was the defending champion, but she withdrew before the tournament due to an injury.

Seeds
The top eight seeds received a bye into the second round. 

 Elina Svitolina (second round)
 Karolína Plíšková (third round)
 Aryna Sabalenka (quarterfinals)
 Petra Kvitová (second round, retired)
 Kiki Bertens (second round)
 Belinda Bencic (third round)
 Victoria Azarenka (withdrew) 
 Iga Świątek (third round)

 Garbiñe Muguruza (champion)
 Elise Mertens (semifinals)
 Madison Keys (second round)
 Markéta Vondroušová (second round)
 Petra Martić (first round)
 Elena Rybakina (second round)
 Anett Kontaveit (third round)
 Maria Sakkari (first round)

Draw

Finals

Top half

Section 1

Section 2

Bottom half

Section 3

Section 4

Qualifying

Seeds

Qualifiers

Lucky losers

Draw

First qualifier

Second qualifier

Third qualifier

Fourth qualifier

Fifth qualifier

Sixth qualifier

Seventh qualifier

Eighth qualifier

References

External links
Main draw
Qualifying draw

Women's Singles
2021 WTA Tour